This is a list of Swedish football transfers for the 2022–23 winter transfer window. Only transfers featuring Allsvenskan are listed.

Allsvenskan

Note: Flags indicate national team as has been defined under FIFA eligibility rules. Players may hold more than one non-FIFA nationality.

Häcken

In:

Out:

Djurgården

In:

Out:

Hammarby

In:

Out:

Kalmar

In:

Out:

AIK

In:

Out:

Elfsborg

In:

Out:

Malmö

In:

Out:

Göteborg

In:

Out:

Mjällby

In:

Out:

Värnamo

In:

Out:

Sirius

In:

Out:

Norrköping

In:

Out:

Degerfors

In:

Out:

Varberg

In:

Out:

Brommapojkarna

In:

Out:

Halmstad

In:

Out:

See also
 2023 Allsvenskan

References

External links
 Official site of the SvFF
 Official site of the Allsvenskan

Football transfers winter 2022–23
Transfers
2023